Garvan may refer to:

People
Francis Patrick Garvan (1875–1937), American lawyer, president of the Chemical Foundation
Genevieve Garvan Brady (1880–1938), American philanthropist and Papal duchess
Garvan McCarthy (born 1981), retired Irish sportsperson
Gerry Garvan, former Irish footballer and coach who played as a midfielder
John Garvan Murtha (born 1941), United States federal judge
Liz Garvan, camogie player
Noel Garvan, Gaelic football player from Laois in Ireland
Owen Garvan (born 1988), Irish footballer

Places
Garvan, Gabrovo Province, village in Gabrovo Province, Bulgaria
Garvan, Silistra Province, village in Sitovo Municipality, Silistra Province, Bulgaria
Garvan, Iran, a village in Sistan and Baluchestan Province, Iran
Garvan, a village in the Konče municipality in eastern North Macedonia
Garvăn, a village in Jijila Commune, Tulcea County, Romania
Garvan, a village in Highland, Scotland
Garvan Woodland Gardens 210 acres of botanical garden by the Hot Springs National Park in Hot Springs, Arkansas, USA
South Garvan, crofting township on the south shore of Loch Eil, in the Scottish Highlands

Other uses
Garvan–Olin Medal, annual award for service to chemistry by women chemists
Garvan Institute of Medical Research, founded in 1963 by the Sisters of Charity